Carlos Núñez Cortés (born October 15, 1942 in Buenos Aires, Argentina) is an actor, composer, multi-instrumentist and singer. He has been a member of Les Luthiers since 1965 (during the "prehistory" of the group) until 2017, when he retired. He also wrote 3 books (in Spanish): "Los juegos de Mastropiero", "100 caracoles argentinos" and "Memorias de un luthier".

In Les Luthiers, his functions included:

 Creating new instruments (e.g. glamocot).
 Composing (e.g. Las Majas, Teorema de Thales, San Ictícola, Epopeya de Edipo).
 Vocal arrangements (e.g. Conozca el Interior).
 Singing (e.g. Voglio Entrare, most Serenatas, A la Playa con Mariana, etc.).
 Playing piano and synths as well as many other instruments (tubófono, recorder, washboard, glamocot, kazoo, coconut marimba, etc.).

He is also an expert malacologist, owning an extensive collection of sea shells. He published a book on the subject, 100 Caracoles Argentinos, co-written with the naturalist Tito Narosky. Núñez Cortés holds a degree in biological chemistry. He is now participating as a columnist for the Podcast called "La Hora de la Nostalgia"

References

1942 births
People from Buenos Aires
Argentine musicians
Argentine malacologists
Les Luthiers
Living people